Swapna (born 6 September 1974) is the managing editor of the Telugu-language news channel 10TV. 
She is also a Telugu-language TV presenter who initially worked for Tv9 and is also a journalist.

Biography
Swapna was born in Hyderabad to Jyotsna, an FM radio presenter known for the popular programme JAPA 4. Her maternal grandmother is a presenter of Radio Bhanumati of All India Radio.

Swapna started her career in TV anchoring with TV9 (Telugu) and hosted popular shows such as Shara Maamule. She later moved to radio as the regional programming head of BIG FM 92.7. She hosted the Ramuism series with RGV.She is a trained performer of Carnatic classical vocal and musical instruments.

Filmography

References

Living people
Indian women television journalists
Indian television journalists
Journalists from Andhra Pradesh
Indian women television presenters
Indian television presenters
1974 births
Television personalities from Andhra Pradesh
21st-century Indian women writers
21st-century Indian writers
21st-century Indian journalists
Writers from Hyderabad, India